River Bottom is an album by the progressive bluegrass band Country Gentlemen, released in 1980.

Track listing

 Riverboat Fantasy (Dowell)
 God's Coloring Book (Parton)
 River Bottom (Wheeler) 	 
 Drifting Too Far from the Shore
 Coal, Black Gold (Simons)	 
 The "In" Crowd Lehner, McBee)
 Apple Blossom Time in Annapolis Valley 		 
 Electricity (Murphy)
 I'm Lonesome Without You Stanley 	 
 Loving Her Was Easier (Kristofferson)
 Things in Life (Stover)
 Honey Don't (Perkins)

Personnel
 Charlie Waller - guitar, vocals
 Rick Allred - mandolin, vocals
 Kent Dowell - banjo, vocals
 Bill Yates - bass, vocals

References

1981 albums
Sugar Hill Records albums
The Country Gentlemen albums